Konstantin Turukin (born September 28, 1990) is a Russian professional ice hockey player. He is currently playing with Metallurg Novokuznetsk of the Kontinental Hockey League (KHL)

Turukin made his Kontinental Hockey League debut playing with Metallurg Novokuznetsk during the 2009–10 KHL season.

References

External links

1990 births
Living people
Beibarys Atyrau players
Dizel Penza players
HC Almaty players
HC Sarov players
Kazzinc-Torpedo players
Kuznetskie Medvedi players
Metallurg Novokuznetsk players
Russian ice hockey forwards
Universiade medalists in ice hockey
Universiade bronze medalists for Russia
Competitors at the 2013 Winter Universiade
People from Novokuznetsk
Sportspeople from Kemerovo Oblast